Inflammation Research is a monthly peer-reviewed medical journal covering immunology. It was established in 1969 as Agents and Actions, obtaining its current name in 1995. It is the official journal of the European Histamine Research Society and the International Association of Inflammation Societies. The editor-in-chief is John A. Di Battista (McGill University Health Center).

Abstracting and indexing 
The journal is abstracted and indexed in:

According to the Journal Citation Reports, the journal has a 2013 impact factor of 2.143.

References

External links 
 

Publications established in 1969
Immunology journals
Springer Science+Business Media academic journals
Monthly journals
English-language journals